The 2008 season was Bunyodkor's second season in the Uzbek League in Uzbekistan. Bunyodkor competed in the Uzbek League, the Uzbek Cup and AFC Champions League tournaments.

Squad

Technical staff

Transfers

In

Loans in

Out

Released

Competitions
Bunyodkor was present in all major competitions: Uzbek League, the AFC Champions League and the Uzbek Cup.

Uzbek League

League table

Results

Uzbekistan Cup

Final

AFC Champions League

Group stage

Knockout stage

Squad statistics

Appearances and goals

|-
|colspan="14"|Players who left Bunyodkor during the season:

|}

Goal scorers

References

External links

 Official Website 
 Championat.uz 

Bunyodkor
Sport in Tashkent
FC Bunyodkor seasons